John Temple (1731 – 17 November 1798) was the first British consul-general to the United States and the first British diplomat to have been born in what later became the United States. He was sometimes known as (but not universally acknowledged to be) Sir John Temple, 8th Baronet.

Early life

John Temple was born in Boston in 1731.  His father, Robert Temple (1694–1754), was a captain in the British army, and his mother was Mehitabel Nelson (1691–1775) of Boston.

Career
In 1762, he was appointed lieutenant governor of the Province of New Hampshire and surveyor general of customs.

Temple was politically aligned with the populist faction in Massachusetts politics, and strongly opposed to the domination of colonial rule by Thomas Hutchinson and the Oliver family.  Temple may have played a role in the Hutchinson Letters Affair of 1773 that inflamed political tensions in Massachusetts and led to the recall of Hutchinson, who was then governor of the province.

In 1785, he was appointed consul-general to the United States, and remained in this post in New York City until his death (succeeded by Thomas Henry Barclay).

Peerage
Following the death of Sir Richard Temple, 7th Baronet in 1786, John Temple claimed the Temple Baronetcy of Stowe on the basis of a declaration by George Nugent-Temple-Grenville, 1st Marquess of Buckingham, but his claim is disputed.  It is not recognised, for instance, by Cracroft's Peerage, which considers the baronetcy to be dormant. However, his claim seems to have been generally recognised during his lifetime and his son's, for example by Burke's Peerage.

His eldest son Grenville succeeded to his claim to the baronetcy.

Personal life

In 1767, he married Elizabeth Bowdoin (1750–1809), daughter of James Bowdoin, who later became Governor of Massachusetts. Together, they were the parents of:

 Sir Grenville Temple, 9th Baronet (1768–1829), who married Elizabeth Watson. After his death, he was buried in the English Cemetery, Florence.
 Elizabeth Bowdoin Temple (1769–1825), who married Thomas Lindall Winthrop (1760–1841), who later became the 13th Lieutenant Governor of Massachusetts.
 Augusta Grenville Temple (1779–1852), who married William Lambe Palmer of England, a British army captain with the 18th Light Dragoons.

Temple died 17 November 1798.

Descendants
Through his eldest son Sir Grenville Temple, he was the grandfather of Sir Grenville Temple, the 10th Baronet (1799–1847), who published "Travels in Greece and Turkey and the Mediterranean", in 1843. He is also, through his daughter Elizabeth Bowdoin Temple an ancestor of US Politician John Kerry.

References

External links
 

British diplomats
1731 births
1798 deaths